Datana diffidens is a species of moth in the family Notodontidae (the prominents). It was first described by Harrison Gray Dyar Jr. in 1917 and it is found in North America.

The MONA or Hodges number for Datana diffidens is 7912.

References

Further reading

 
 
 

Notodontidae
Articles created by Qbugbot
Moths described in 1917